Rolf Arne "Råttan (The Rat)" Edberg (born 29 September 1950) is a retired Swedish ice hockey player.

After playing in Sweden for many years, Edberg signed as a free agent with the Washington Capitals.  After playing three seasons with the Capitals, Edberg returned to Sweden where he played for several more years before retiring.

Edberg should not be confused with his namesake, the well-known Swedish journalist, author, member of parliament and ambassador Rolf Edberg.

Career statistics

Regular season and playoffs

International

External links

1950 births
Living people
AIK IF players
Ice hockey people from Stockholm
Swedish ice hockey centres
Undrafted National Hockey League players
Washington Capitals players